Cyperus oxycarpus is a sedge of the family Cyperaceae that is native to Australia.

It blooms between March and April and produces brown flowers.

In Western Australia it is found around wet areas in the Kimberley region where it grows in clay soils.

See also
List of Cyperus species

References

Plants described in 1940
Flora of Western Australia
oxycarpus
Taxa named by Stanley Thatcher Blake